Kotlin may refer to:
 Kotlin, Greater Poland Voivodeship, a village in west-central Poland
 Kotlin Island, a Russian island near the head of the Gulf of Finland
 Kotlin (programming language), a general-purpose programming language
 Kotlin-class destroyer, a class of destroyers built for the Soviet Navy
 Kotlin, a brand of fruit and vegetable products made by Agros Nova, a Polish company